La Valletta Brianza is a comune in the province of Lecco, Lombardy, northern Italy. It was created on 30 January 2015 when the two former communes o Perego and Rovagnate merged. The communal seat is located in the latter hamlet.

References